Tired Business Men is a 1927 American short silent comedy film directed by Anthony Mack. It was the 60th Our Gang short subject released.

Cast

The Gang
 Joe Cobb as Joe O'Farrell
 Jackie Condon as Jackie
 Jean Darling as Bossy
 Allen Hoskins as Farina
 Jannie Hoskins as Mango
 Scooter Lowry as Skooter
 Jay R. Smith as Jay
 Bobby Young as Bonedust
 Peggy Eames as Peggy
 Bobby Mallon as Bobby
 Johnny Aber as Our Gang member
 Jimsy Boudwin as Our Gang member
 Andy Shuford as Our Gang member
 Pal the Dog as himself

Additional cast
 Charles A. Bachman as Officer O'Farrell 
 Ruth Robinson as Joe's mother
 S. D. Wilcox as Officer
 Billy Butts as Undetermined role

See also
 Our Gang filmography

References

External links

1927 films
1927 comedy films
1927 short films
American black-and-white films
Films directed by Robert A. McGowan
American silent short films
Hal Roach Studios short films
Our Gang films
1920s American films
Silent American comedy films